The Ethics and Excellence in Journalism Foundation (EEJF) is a grant-making foundation based in Oklahoma that provides grants to journalism institutions throughout the United States. In 2011, the foundation's assets were $91.1 million and $4 million was distributed in grants.

The EEJF was established in 1982 by Edith Kinney Gaylord. Robert J. Ross has been the President and CEO of the EEJF since 2003.

Mission

The Foundation's mission, according to its website, is "to invest in the future of journalism by building the ethics, skills and opportunities needed to advance principled, probing news and information". It works toward this goal by giving contributions to a variety of journalistic enterprises.

Grant recipients 

The Ethics and Excellence in Journalism Foundation has supported over 100 non-profit journalism-oriented organizations. Grant recipients have included:

Washington Center for Politics & Journalism, Washington D.C. Politics & Journalism Semester
Youth News Service, Los Angeles Bureau
Center for Investigative Reporting
University of California, Berkeley
Association for Education in Journalism and Mass Communication
Reporters Committee for Freedom of the Press
Student Press Law Center
Friends of the Oklahoma History Center
Oklahoma Historical Society

Notable contributions 

The contributions of the Foundation have made an impact in the quality and capability of leading journalism projects nationwide.  Some of Ethics and Excellence in Journalism Foundation's most notable sponsorships have been awarded to:

Brandeis University, Judge Brandeis Innocence Project
George Washington University, The Kalb Report
Georgetown University & The Center for Public Integrity, The Pearl Project
Syracuse University, Transactional Records Access Clearinghouse for the FOIA Project
University of Oklahoma, Gaylord College of Journalism and Mass Communication

References

External links
 

Foundations based in the United States
Non-profit organizations based in Oklahoma
Ethics organizations
Journalism ethics